Paweł Lisowski (born October 8, 1991 in Szczecin) is a Polish footballer who currently plays for GKS Tychy on loan from Piast Gliwice as a midfielder.

Career

Lisowski made his Ekstraklasa debut on 27.03.2010.

References

External links
 

1991 births
Polish footballers
Ruch Chorzów players
Piast Gliwice players
GKS Tychy players
Ekstraklasa players
Living people
Sportspeople from Szczecin
Association football midfielders